Turridrupa acutigemmata is a species of sea snail, a marine gastropod mollusk in the family Turridae, the turrids.

Description
The length of the shell varies between 9 mm and 30.5 mm.

Distribution
This marine species occurs off South Africa; Mozambique; Sri Lanka, Indonesia, Fiji Islands, Solomon Islands, New Caledonia, Queensland (Australia).

References

 Schepman, M.M. 1913. Toxoglossa. pp. 384–396 in Weber, M. & de Beaufort, L.F. (eds). The Prosobranchia, Pulmonata and Opisthobranchia Tectibranchiata, Tribe Bullomorpha, of the Siboga Expedition. Monograph 49. Siboga Expeditie 32(2) 
 Melvill, J.C. 1917. A revision of the Turridae (Pleurotomidae) occurring in the Persian Gulf, Gulf of Oman and North Arabian Sea as evidenced mostly through the results of dredgings carried out by Mr. F.W. Townsend, 1893–1914. Proceedings of the Malacological Society of London 12(4-5): 140-201 
 Allan, J.K. 1950. Australian shells: with related animals living in the sea, in freshwater and on the land. Melbourne : Georgian House xix, 470 pp., 45 pls, 112 text figs.
 Powell, A.W.B. 1966. The molluscan families Speightiidae and Turridae, an evaluation of the valid taxa, both Recent and fossil, with list of characteristic species. Bulletin of the Auckland Institute and Museum. Auckland, New Zealand 5: 1–184, pls 1-23
 Powell, A.W.B. 1968. The turrid shellfish of Australian waters. Australian Natural History 1 16: 1–6 
 Shuto, T. 1975. Notes on type species of some turrid genera based on the type specimens in the British Museum (N.H.). Venus 33(4): 161-175 
 Cernohorsky, W.O. 1978. Tropical Pacific marine shells. Sydney : Pacific Publications 352 pp., 68 pls. [
 Kilburn R.N. (1988). Turridae (Mollusca: Gastropoda) of southern Africa and Mozambique. Part 4. Subfamilies Drillinae, Crassispirinae and Strictispirinae. Annals of the Natal Museum. 29(1): 167-320
 Wilson, B. 1994. Australian marine shells. Prosobranch gastropods. Kallaroo, WA : Odyssey Publishing Vol. 2 370 pp. 
 Steyn, D.G. & Lussi, M. (1998) Marine Shells of South Africa. An Illustrated Collector's Guide to Beached Shells. Ekogilde Publishers, Hartebeespoort, South Africa,

External links
 Smith EA. 1877. Diagnoses of new species of Pleurotomidae in the British Museum. Ann Mag. Nat Hist. 4 (19):488–501
 Smith, E. A. (1904). Natural history notes from H.M. Indian Marine survey steamer 'Investigator,' Commander T. H. Heming, R.N. —Series III., No. 1. On Mollusca from the Bay of Bengal and the Arabian Sea. Annals and Magazine of Natural History. ser. 7, 13 (78): 453-473
 Hedley, C. (1922). A revision of the Australian Turridae. Records of the Australian Museum. 13 (6): 213-359
 Tucker, J.K. 2004 Catalog of recent and fossil turrids (Mollusca: Gastropoda). Zootaxa 682:1-1295.

acutigemmata
Gastropods described in 1877